The Thessaloniki Film Festival started in 1960 and at the beginning comprised exclusively Greek films. The first years (1960-1965) the festival was called "Week of Greek Cinema". From 1965 to 1991 the festival was called Festival of Greek Cinema and from 1992 became an international film festival as the Thessaloniki International Film Festival. Since 1992, Greek films compete in a different section of the festival with the name Greek State Film Awards. Since 2008, the Greek competition was abolished and remained only the international section of the festival. Today the Greek films compete in Hellenic Film Academy Awards. Below are considered the awards of Thessaloniki Film Festival during the period that only Greek films took part (1960-1991).

The awards comprise the categories: best film, best director, best screenplay, best editing, best cinematography, best actor, best actress, best supporting actor, best supporting actress, best music and other.

Best Film

Best Director

Best Screenplay

Best Actor

Best Actress

Best Supporting Actor

Best Supporting Actress

Best cinematography

Best Music

Best Editing

Best Production Design

Best Sound

Best Costumes Design

Best Make-up

See also
Thessaloniki International Film Festival
Greek State Film Awards

References

External links
Thessaloniki International Film Festival - official website

Greek film awards
Film festivals in Greece
1960 establishments in Greece
Film festivals established in 1960
1991 disestablishments in Greece
Recurring events disestablished in 1991
Festivals in Thessaloniki
Annual events in Thessaloniki